Jesmond Zerafa (born 3 August 1965, in Malta) is a former professional footballer and a manager. During his career, he played primarily as a striker.

International career

International goals
Scores and results list Malta's goal tally first.

Manager career

Qormi
Zerafa joined the Maltese First Division side Qormi in the summer of 2007. The move was an instant success, as he led the club to a 3rd-place finish in the Maltese First Division. However, as the club had finished equal on points with 2nd placed Mosta, a decider was necessary to determine which team would earn promotion to the Maltese Premier League. Qormi came out on top, beating Mosta on penalties.

The 2008–09 season saw Zerafa make a major reshuffle in the Qormi playing staff, opting to go for experience, with the hope of remaining in the Maltese Premier League. The season long loan of Sliema Wanderers midfielder Joseph Farrugia was renewed for another season. The club also added Massimo Grima and Keith Fenech, who joined from Valletta on season long loan deals, as did Marsaxlokk duo Reuben Gauci and Shawn Tellus. The club also made the permanent signings of Chucks Nwoko from Sliema Wanderers and Roderick Sammut from Birkirkara. Qormi spent the best part of the season languishing above the relegation zone, Zerafa added to the ranks with the signing of Marsaxlokk defender Stephen Wellman. The gamble paid off for Jesmond, as Qormi retained the Maltese Premier League status after finishing in 7th position.

Jesmond led Qormi into the 2009–10 season, again making some shrewd acquisitions along the way, Joseph Farrugia's loan move was made permanent, and again Valletta duo Massimo Grima and Keith Fenech's season long loan deals were extended for another season. Zerafa also signed Brazilian striker Camilo, Qormi were the surprise package of the season, exceeding expectations and even sitting top the division for some of the season. Jesmond's reign came to an end on 28 April 2010, when the club decided to release Zerafa following a breakdown in contract negations. Jesmond was rumored to not be willing to commit himself on a new contract for next season, and it is rumored that he will join his former club Valletta for the 2010–11 season.

Valletta F.C.
On 29 May 2010 he signed a deal with Valletta F.C., to become the team's new manager.

Gzira United
On 11 February 2019 Zerafa replaced Darren Abdilla as manager of Gżira United. After reaching the third place in the league, he terminated his contract, being replaced by Giovanni Tedesco.

Second spell at Valletta FC
In June 2020 Zerafa agreed to sign a two-years contract with Valletta, coming back to the club where he spent the most part of his playing career and where he had a first spell between 2010 and 2012. His second spell at the helm of his former club only lasted a few months, and Zerafa resigned in November 2020.

References

External links
 Jesmond Zerafa at MaltaFootball.com
 Jesmond Zerafa at Footballdatabase

Living people
1965 births
Maltese footballers
Malta international footballers
Association football forwards
Valletta F.C. players
Maltese football managers
Qormi F.C. managers
Valletta F.C. managers